Castillo de Alesga is a ruined Spanish fortress. It is situated on a hillside in San Pedro Valley near the town of San Salvador d'Alesga, in the council of Teverga, Asturias. It is situated near the Puerto de Ventana. The remains of a small circular tower and a section of drywall are visible. Although the current structure is medieval, it is speculated that it was originally a Roman tower. The tower is mentioned as early as 1122. In the 15th century, it was owned by the Casa de Miranda.

See also
List of castles in Spain

References

 FANJUL PERAZA, A., MENÉNDEZ BUEYES, L., y ÁLVAREZ PEÑA, A. (2005): La fortaleza de Alesga (Teverga, Asturias): una posible turris de control altoimperial", en Gallaecia 24, pp. 181–191.

Alesga
Ruins in Spain